Episode Six, Episode 6 or Episode VI may refer to:

Episode Six, a British band
Return of the Jedi, a 1983 film also known as Star Wars: Episode VI – Return of the Jedi
Episode 6 (Humans series 1), TV series episode
Episode 6 (Skins), TV series episode
Episode 6 (Ashes to Ashes), TV series episode
Episode 6 (Peep Show), TV series episode
Episode 6 (The Tudors), TV series episode
Episode 6 (Mythbusters), TV series episode